= Currentweek =

- Categories: Online magazine
- First issue: 12 May 2008
- Based in: Bhopal
- Website: currentweek.net

Currentweek is an English-language online news magazine in India. The magazine provides information on various topics like technology, health, current affairs, sports, environment, space, politics etc.
